Swiss pop recording artist Patrick Nuo began his career in 2003, when he signed with Warner Music and released his debut album Welcome (2003). A top 20 chart success in Switzerland and Germany, it spawned three singles, including debut single "5 Days" and follow-up "Reanimate", which reached number 18 on the Swiss Singles Chart. The same year, Nuo joined Zeichen der Zeit, a Christian music project whose first single "Du bist nicht allein" became a top ten success in Germany. A second single released from the project's self-titled compilation album, "Ein weiterer Morgen", entered the top forty of the German Singles Chart the following year. Also in 2004, a reissue of Welcome was released. It produced the single "Undone", which served as the theme song for American comedy film Scooby-Doo 2: Monsters Unleashed (2004) in German-speaking Europe.

In May 2005, Nuo's second album Superglue was released. While not as commercially successful as Welcome in Germany, it would eventually become his highest-charting to date, reaching number four on the Swiss Albums Chart. Two singles were released from Superglue: "Girl in the Moon" and "Beautiful", the latter of which became his first and only top ten hit to date. The song peaked at number nine and number seven in Switzerland and Austria respectively. In 2006, Nuo reteamed with Zeichen der Zeit to produce their second album Generation David (2006), and participated in another non-profit-making aid project when she provided vocals for the Fury in the Slaughterhouse cover, charity single "Won't Forget These Days," released during the 2006 FIFA World Cup.

In 2007, after a label change to Ariola Records, Nuo's third album Nuo was released. It widely failed to match the success of his previous studio albums and produced three singles of which lead single "Watchin' Over You" became the only single to chart. In September 2009, the single "Come On Now" was released on Flash Records.

Albums

Singles

As lead artist

As featured performer

Appearances

Music videos

References

External links
 Official Website (German)

Nuo, Patrick